The Great Stew Chase is a 15-kilometer road running competition held annually in Lynn, Massachusetts. The race website claims that it is the third oldest 15K in the USA, having started in 1975. The race is generally held in late February, but has been delayed three times due to weather.  The post race food is Beef Stew, hence the race name.

References

External links
Official web page

15K runs
1975 establishments in Massachusetts
Recurring sporting events established in 1975
Road running competitions in the United States
Sports competitions in Massachusetts
Sports in Lynn, Massachusetts